Stanislava Líšková (born 15 March 1997) is a Slovak footballer who plays as an offender and has appeared for the Slovakia women's national team.

Career
Lišková has been capped for the Slovakia national team, appearing for the team during the 2019 FIFA Women's World Cup qualifying cycle.

References

External links
 
 
 

1997 births
Living people
Slovak women's footballers
Slovakia women's international footballers
Women's association football defenders
Medyk Konin players
Expatriate women's footballers in Poland
Slovak expatriate sportspeople in Poland